Lasthenia chrysantha is a species of flowering plant in the family Asteraceae known by the common name alkalisink goldfields. It is endemic to the California Central Valley, where it grows in vernal pools and alkali flats.

Description
Lasthenia chrysantha is an annual herb approaching a maximum height near 28 centimeters. The stem may be branched or not and it bears mostly hairless, linear leaves up to 7 or 8 centimeters long.

Atop the hairy to hairless stems are inflorescences of flower heads with hairless phyllaries. The head contains many yellow disc florets with a fringe of small yellow ray florets. The fruit is a black oval-shaped achene a few millimeters long with a fringe of tiny dull hairs around the edge. Like other goldfields, populations of this species bloom in the spring to produce a carpet of yellow in its habitat.

External links
Jepson Manual Treatment: Lasthenia chrysantha
USDA Plants Profile
Lasthenia chrysantha  U.C. Photo gallery

chrysantha
Endemic flora of California
Halophytes
Natural history of the Central Valley (California)
Flora without expected TNC conservation status